"Taste of the Sun" is a song by Meat Puppets, the second single released from No Joke!, along with three alternative versions and four other songs.

Track listing
(All songs by Curt Kirkwood unless otherwise noted)

 "Taste of the Sun" (radio version) – 3:56
 "Taste of the Sun" – 3:59
 "The Adventures of Pee Pee the Sailor" – 2:53
 "Vampires" (live) – 4:31
 "Chemical Garden" (live) – 4:20
 "Tennessee Stud" (Jimmy Driftwood) – 3:29
 "Taste of the Sun" (Mark Trombino Mix) – 3:53
 "Taste of the Sun" (live) – 3:56

Track 2 is on No Joke!
Tracks 4, 5 and 8 were recorded live November 26, 1995

References 

Meat Puppets songs
1996 singles
Songs written by Curt Kirkwood
1995 songs